Ilia Anatolyevich Shtokalov (born 1 September 1986, in Pobeda) is a Russian sprint canoeist. At the 2012 Summer Olympics, he competed in the Men's C-1 1000 metres. He finished 8th in the final.

At the 2016 Summer Olympics he won a bronze medal after a disqualification of a competitor.

References

1986 births
Living people
People from Vyborg District
Russian male canoeists
Olympic canoeists of Russia
Canoeists at the 2012 Summer Olympics
Canoeists at the 2016 Summer Olympics
Medalists at the 2016 Summer Olympics
Olympic bronze medalists for Russia
Olympic medalists in canoeing
Sportspeople from Leningrad Oblast